Edward Graff (August 20, 1897 – March 19, 1954) was an American rugby union player who competed in the 1924 Summer Olympics. He was born in San Francisco, California. Graff was a member of the American rugby union team, which won the gold medal.

References

External links
profile

1897 births
1954 deaths
American rugby union players
Rugby union players at the 1924 Summer Olympics
Olympic gold medalists for the United States in rugby
United States international rugby union players
Medalists at the 1924 Summer Olympics